Flora R. Levin (died 2009) was a historian of ancient Greek music and mathematics, particularly known for her work on Nicomachus.

Books
Levin's books included:
The Harmonics of Nicomachus and the Pythagorean Tradition (American Philological Association, 1975)
The Manual of Harmonics of Nicomachus the Pythagorean (translated and with commentary by Levin, Phanes Press, 1994)
Greek Reflections on the Nature of Music (Cambridge University Press, 2009)

Education and career
Levin taught classics at Case Western Reserve University prior to 1962, and completed a Ph.D. at Columbia University in 1967. She died in 2009.

References

Year of birth missing
2009 deaths
American historians
American women historians
American historians of mathematics
Scholars of ancient Greek history
Case Western Reserve University faculty
Columbia University alumni